Varposht or Var Posht may refer to:
 Varposht, Nain
 Var Posht, Tiran and Karvan
 Var Posht Rural District, in Tiran and Karvan County